This is a list of villages and settlements in Kano State, Nigeria organised by local government area (LGA) and district/area (with postal codes also given).
Unguwar dorawa in gwarzo and Munchika village in Ungogo local government areas were included in the list.

By postal code

By electoral ward
Below is a list of polling units, including villages and schools, organised by electoral ward.

References

Kano
Kano State